Wat Lamai is a Buddhist temple in the old part of Ban Lamai (usually known as Lamai Beach) on the resort island of Ko Samui, Thailand. Located adjacent to a main bend in Thai Route 4161, the island's ring road, it has a museum of Buddhist artifacts and the history of Ko Samui and also has a cultural hall for public cultural events and other gatherings such as weddings and funerals.

See also
List of Buddhist temples

References

Buddhist temples in Surat Thani Province
Tourist attractions in Surat Thani province